The 2020 elections for the Illinois House of Representatives were held on Tuesday, November 3, 2020, to elect representatives from all 118 districts. The primary election occurred on March 17, 2020. The winners of this election are currently serving in the 102nd General Assembly, with seats apportioned among the states based on the 2010 United States census. The Democratic Party has held a House majority since 1997. The inauguration of the 102nd General Assembly occurred on Wednesday January 13, 2021.

The elections for the Illinois Fair Tax, United States President, Illinois United States Senator, Illinois's 18 congressional districts, and the Illinois Senate were held on this date.

The Republican Party needed to flip control of 16 seats to earn a majority in the Illinois House. The Republican Party flipped 4 seats and the Democratic Party flipped 3 seats, resulting in a net gain of one additional seat for the Republicans. The Democratic Party retained their supermajority after this election.

Predictions

Results

Close races

District index

Districts 1–25

District 1
The 1st district has been represented by Democrat Aaron Ortiz since January 9, 2019. Ortiz was unopposed in his first election in 2018. Ortiz faced Alicia Martinez, a worker with Brackenbox, Inc. and a former staffer for Alderman Edward M. Burke. After winning the nomination, Ortiz faced no other ballot-listed candidates in the general election.

Endorsements

Results

District 2
The 2nd district includes all or parts of the Chicago neighborhoods of Armour Square, Bridgeport, Brighton Park, Lower West Side, McKinley Park, Near South Side, Near West Side, and New City. The district has been represented by Democrat Theresa Mah since January 11, 2017. Mah was re-elected unopposed in the 2018 election. Mah faced two primary challengers on March 17, 2020: Kenneth M. Kozlar, a retired research technician and Bobby Martinez Olson, an attorney. After winning the nomination, Mah faced no ballot-listed candidates in the general election.

Endorsements

Results

District 3
The 3rd district includes parts of Elmwood Park, as well as all or parts of the Chicago neighborhoods of Austin, Belmont Cragin, Dunning, Hermosa, Logan Square, Montclare, and Portage Park. The district had been represented by Democrat Luis Arroyo since his appointment in December 2006. Arroyo was re-elected unopposed in the 2018 election. Arroyo would resign from his seat on November 1, 2019 after he was arrested a week prior for a federal bribery charge and "just hours before a legislative committee was set to consider his ouster from the General Assembly." Eva-Dina Delgado was appointed to his seat on November 15, 2019. Her appointment came under contentious fire from Illinois House Speaker Michael Madigan after proxy votes from former representative Arroyo were used to select Delgado as his replacement. Delgado faced primary challenger Nidia Carranza, a bilingual Pre-K teacher, on March 17, 2020. After winning the nomination, Delgado faced no ballot-listed candidates in the general election.

Endorsements

Results

District 4
The 4th district includes parts of the Chicago neighborhoods of Hermosa, Humboldt Park, Logan Square, and West Town. Ramirez was elected with 99.98% of the vote in 2018. The district has been represented by Democrat Delia Ramirez since January 9, 2019. Ramirez faced no other ballot-listed candidates in the general election.

Endorsements

Results

District 5
The 5th district includes parts of the Chicago neighborhoods of Armour Square, Avalon Park, Douglas, Englewood, Fuller Park, Grand Boulevard, Greater Grand Crossing, Loop, Near North Side, Near South Side, South Shore, Washington Park, and Woodlawn. The district has been represented by Democrat Lamont Robinson since January 9, 2019. Robinson was unopposed in his first election in 2018. Robinson faced no other ballot-listed candidates in the general election.

District 6
The 6th district includes parts of the Chicago neighborhoods of Armour Square, Bridgeport, Chicago Lawn, Douglas, Englewood, Fuller Park, Grand Boulevard, Greater Grand Crossing, Loop, Near North Side, Near South Side, Near West Side, New City, and West Englewood. The district has been represented by Democrat Sonya Harper since her appointment in October 2015. Harper was re-elected unopposed in the 2018 election. Harper faced no other ballot-listed candidates in the general election.

District 7
The 7th district, located in the Chicago area, includes all or parts of Bellwood, Berkeley, Broadview, Forest Park, Hillside, La Grange Park, Maywood, Melrose Park, Northlake, Oak Brook, River Forest, Westchester, and Western Springs. The district has been represented by Democrat Emanuel "Chris" Welch since January 9, 2013. Welch was re-elected unopposed in the 2018 election. Welch faced no other ballot-listed candidates in the general election.

District 8
The 8th district, located in the Chicago area, includes all or parts of Berwyn, Brookfield, Forest Park, La Grange, La Grange Park, North Riverside, and Oak Park and parts of the Chicago neighborhood of Austin. The district has been represented by Democrat La Shawn Ford since January 10, 2007. Ford was re-elected unopposed in the 2018 election. Ford faced no other ballot-listed candidates in the general election.

District 9
The 9th district includes parts of the Chicago neighborhoods of East Garfield Park, Lincoln Park, Loop, Lower West Side, Near North Side, Near West Side, North Lawndale, South Lawndale, West Garfield Park, and West Town. The district had been represented by Democrat Art Turner since December 2010. Turner was re-elected unopposed in the 2018 election. In 2019, Turner would not seek re-election. Seven candidates ran for the Democratic nomination for the district:
 Lakesia Collins, union organizer
 Ty Cratic, political consultant and lobbyist;
 Maurice Edwards, a worker in Cook County government;
 Nicole 'Nikki' Harvey, a director for Congressman Danny K. Davis' office;
 Trina Mangrum, chief of staff to Alderman Jason Ervin;
 Sandra Schneller, a state clinical practice manager;
 Aaron Turner, formerly holding multiple positions with numerous Illinois agencies.
After winning the nomination, Collins faced no other ballot-listed candidates in the general election. On July 3, 2020, Art Turner resigned from his seat to retire. Collins, the winner of the primary, was appointed to Turner's seat on July 24, 2020.

Endorsements

Results

District 10
The 10th district includes parts of the Chicago neighborhoods of Austin, East Garfield Park, Humboldt Park, Lincoln Park, Logan Square, Near North Side, Near West Side, West Garfield Park, and West Town. The district had been represented by Democrat Melissa Conyears-Ervin since January 11, 2017. Conyears-Ervin was re-elected unopposed in the 2018 election. Conyears-Ervin would later be elected as City Treasurer of Chicago and leave her seat open. Democrat Jawaharial Williams was appointed to her seat in May 2019. Williams faced two primary challengers: Gerard Moorer, a deputy district director for Illinois's 7th congressional district and Gina Zuccaro. After winning the nomination, Williams faced no other ballot-listed candidates in the general election.

Endorsements

Results

District 11
The 11th district includes parts of the Chicago neighborhoods of Albany Park, Avondale, Irving Park, Lake View, Lincoln Park, Lincoln Square, Logan Square, and North Center. The district has been represented by Democrat Ann Williams since January 12, 2011. Williams was re-elected unopposed in the 2018 election. Williams faced no other ballot-listed candidates in the general election.

District 12
The 12th district includes parts of the Chicago neighborhoods of Lake View, Lincoln Park, Near North Side, and Uptown. The district had been represented by Democrat Sara Feigenholtz since January 11, 1995. Feigenholtz was re-elected unopposed in the 2018 election. Feigenholtz would become a state senator on January 20, 2020 to fill the vacancy left by former President of the Illinois Senate John Cullerton. The Democratic primary featured six candidates:
 Margaret Croke, deputy chief of staff for the Illinois Department of Commerce and Economic Opportunity
 James "Jimmy" Garfield, an attorney
 Marty Malone, co-founder of the organization Queer Clout Happy Hour
 Yoni Pizer, community liaison for Congressman Mike Quigley
 Ryan Podges, an attorney in labor and employment laws
 Kimberly J. Walz, regional director for Walgreens

38 days before the primary was scheduled to occur, Yoni Pizer was appointed to the seat on February 9, 2020. Chicago Magazine reported candidate Croke (who would later defeat Pizer in the primary) saying, "This Sunday, 38 days before voters have the opportunity to vote for the next State Representative for Illinois’ 12th House District, Chicago Democratic Party insiders rubber stamped the appointment of Jonathan Pizer in an attempt to boost his chances in the March primary election."

After winning the nomination, Croke faced no other ballot-listed candidates in the general election.

District 13
The 13th district includes parts of the Chicago neighborhoods of Albany Park, Edgewater, Lake View, North Center, North Park, Rogers Park, Uptown, and West Ridge. The district has been represented by Democrat Greg Harris since December 2006. Harris was re-elected unopposed in the 2018 election. Harris faced no other ballot-listed candidates in the general election.

District 14
The 14th district, located in the Chicago area, includes parts of Evanston and includes parts of the Chicago neighborhoods of Edgewater, Rogers Park, Uptown, and West Ridge. The district has been represented by Democrat Kelly Cassidy since her appointment in May 2011. Cassidy was re-elected unopposed in the 2018 election. Cassidy faced no other ballot-listed candidates in the general election.

District 15
The 15th district, located in the Chicago area, includes parts of Glenview, Morton Grove, Niles, Park Ridge, and Skokie and includes parts of the Chicago neighborhoods of Albany Park, Forest Glen, Irving Park, Jefferson Park, North Park, and Norwood Park. The district has been represented by Democrat John D'Amico since November 2004. D'Amico was re-elected with 61.50% of the vote in 2018. D'Amico faced no other ballot-listed candidates in the general election.

District 16
The 16th district, located in the Chicago area, includes parts of Lincolnwood, Morton Grove, and Skokie and includes parts of the Chicago neighborhoods of North Park and West Ridge. The district has been represented by Democrat Yehiel Mark Kalish since his appointment in January 2019. Kalish faced two primary challengers for the Democratic nomination: Kevin Olickal, executive director at the Indo-American Democratic Organization and Denyse Wang Stoneback, an independent contractor for project management. Stoneback defeated incumbent Kalish in the primary for the Democratic nomination and faced no other ballot-listed candidates in the general election.

Endorsements

Results

District 17
The 17th district, located in the Chicago area, includes all or parts of Evanston, Glenview, Golf, Morton Grove, Northbrook, Skokie, and Wilmette. The district has been represented by Democrat Jennifer Gong-Gershowitz since January 9, 2019. Gong-Gershowitz was first elected with 69.20% of the vote in 2018. Gong-Gershowitz faced Green Party Christopher Kruger and Republican Yesoe Yoon, anchor and host for the Global Leaders Network TV Program, in the general election.

Endorsements

Results

District 18
The 18th district, located in the Chicago area, includes all or parts of Deerfield, Evanston, Glencoe, Glenview, Kenilworth, Northbrook, Northfield, Wilmette, and Winnetka. The district has been represented by Democrat Robyn Gabel since her appointment in April 2010. Gabel was re-elected with 72.09% of the vote in 2018. Gabel faced Independent candidate Sean Matlis in the general election.

District 19
The 19th district, located in the Chicago area, includes parts of Elmwood Park, Harwood Heights, Norridge, and River Grove and includes parts of the Chicago neighborhoods of Dunning, Forest Glen, Jefferson Park, Norwood Park, O'Hare, and Portage Park. The district had been represented by Democrat Robert Martwick since January 9, 2013. Martwick was re-elected with 60.69% of the vote in 2018. Martwick would be appointed to replace former State Senator John Mulroe, leaving Martwick's own seat vacant. Democrat Lindsey LaPointe would be appointed to the 19th district seat on July 24, 2019. LaPointe faced two primary challengers for the Democratic nomination: Patti Vasquez, former host of "The Patti Vasquez Show" on 720 WGN radio and Joe Duplechin, Chicago police officer. LaPointe faced Republican Jeff Muehlfelder, a violent crimes detective, and Libertarian Joseph Schreiner, a patent agent and translator, in the general election.

Endorsements

Results

District 20
The 20th district, located in the Chicago area, includes parts of Des Plaines, Franklin Park, Harwood Heights, Niles, Norridge, Park Ridge, Rosemont, and Schiller Park and includes parts of the Chicago neighborhoods of Dunning, Edison Park, Norwood Park, and O'Hare. The district had been represented by Republican Michael McAuliffe since his appointment in July 1996. McAuliffe was re-elected unopposed in 2018. McAuliffe would retire as state representative and would be succeeded by Rosemont mayor Bradley Stephens in June 2019. Two candidates ran for the Democratic nomination: R. Cary Capparelli, an online instructor in Geography and Geo-Science for South Dakota State University and Michelle Darbro, a firefighter and paramedic. Stephens faced Democrat Michelle Darbro in the general election.

Endorsements

Results

District 21
The 21st district, located in the Chicago area, includes parts of Bedford Park, Bridgeview, Cicero, Forest View, Lyons, McCook, Riverside, Stickney, and Summit and includes parts of the Chicago neighborhoods of Brighton Park, Garfield Ridge, Lower West Side, McKinley Park, and South Lawndale. The district had been represented by Democrat Celina Villanueva since her appointment in July 2018. Villanueva was unopposed in her first election in 2018. Villanueva would become a state senator on January 7, 2020 to fill the vacancy left by former state senator Martin Sandoval and be succeeded by Edgar González Jr. on January 10, 2020. González Jr. faced no other ballot-listed candidates in the general election.

District 22
The 22nd district, located in the Chicago area, includes parts of Bedford Park and Burbank and includes all or parts of the Chicago neighborhoods of Archer Heights, Ashburn, Brighton Park, Chicago Lawn, Clearing, Gage Park, Garfield Ridge, West Elsdon, and West Lawn. The district has been represented by Mike Madigan since January 13, 1971. He was the 67th Speaker of the House from 1983 to 1995 and has been the 69th Speaker of the House since 1997. Madigan was re-elected unopposed in 2018. Madigan faced no other ballot-listed candidates in the general election.

District 23
The 23rd district, located in the Chicago area, includes parts of Bedford Park, Berwyn, Bridgeview, Brookfield, Burbank, Cicero, Countryside, Hickory Hills, Hodgkins, Justice, La Grange, La Grange Park, McCook, Riverside, and Summit. The district has been represented by Democrat Michael J. Zalewski since December 2008. Zalewski was re-elected unopposed in 2018. Zalewski faced no other ballot-listed candidates in the general election.

District 24
The 24th district, located in the Chicago area, includes parts of Berwyn, Brookfield, Cicero, Riverside, and Stickney and includes parts of the Chicago neighborhood of South Lawndale. The district has been represented by Democrat Elizabeth "Lisa" Hernandez since January 10, 2007. Hernandez was re-elected unopposed in 2018. Hernandez faced no other ballot-listed candidates in the general election.

District 25
The 25th district includes parts of the Chicago neighborhoods of Calumet Heights, East Side, Hegewisch, Hyde Park, Kenwood, South Chicago, South Deering, South Shore, and Woodlawn. The district has been represented by Democrat Curtis Tarver since January 9, 2019. Tarver was elected with 99.93% of the vote in 2018. Tarver faced no other ballot-listed candidates in the general election.

Districts 26–50

District 26
The 26th district includes parts of the Chicago neighborhoods of Calumet Heights, Douglas, Grand Boulevard, Hyde Park, Kenwood, Loop, Near North Side, Near South Side, South Chicago, South Shore, Washington Park, and Woodlawn. The district had been represented by Democrat Christian Mitchell since January 9, 2013. After winning his election and the election of Governor J.B. Pritzker, Mitchell would join the Pritzker administration as a deputy governor. Kam Buckner was appointed on January 18, 2019 to serve out the remainder of Mitchell's term. Buckner faced no other ballot-listed candidates in the general election.

Endorsements

Results

District 27
The 27th district, located in the Chicago area, includes parts of Alsip, Blue Island, Crestwood, Midlothian, Orland Park, Palos Heights, Robbins, and Worth and parts of the Chicago neighborhoods of Auburn Gresham, Beverly, Chatham, Morgan Park, Roseland, Washington Heights, and West Pullman. The district has been represented by Democrat Justin Slaughter since his appointment in January 2017. Slaughter was re-elected unopposed in 2018. Slaughter faced no other ballot-listed candidates in the general election.

Endorsements

Results

District 28
The 28th district, located in the Chicago area, includes parts of Blue Island, Calumet Park, Crestwood, Midlothian, Oak Forest, Orland Park, Riverdale, Robbins, and Tinley Park and parts of the Chicago neighborhoods of Morgan Park, Roseland, and West Pullman. The district has been represented by Democrat Robert Rita since January 8, 2003. Rita was re-elected unopposed in 2018. Rita faced no other ballot-listed candidates in the general election.

District 29
The 29th district, located in the Chicago area, includes parts of Calumet Heights, Chicago Heights, Crete, Dolton, East Hazel Crest, Ford Heights, Glenwood, Harvey, Homewood, Lansing, Lynwood, Monee, Phoenix, Sauk Village, South Chicago Heights, South Holland, Steger, Thornton, and University Park and parts of the Chicago neighborhoods of Riverdale and West Pullman. The district has been represented by Democrat Thaddeus Jones since January 12, 2011. Jones was re-elected unopposed in 2018. Jones faced a primary challenge from DeAndre Tillman, a partner attorney, for the Democratic nomination. After winning the nomination, Jones faced no other ballot-listed candidates in the general election.

Endorsements

Results

District 30
The 30th district, located in the Chicago area, includes all or parts of Blue Island, Dixmoor, Dolton, East Hazel Crest, Flossmoor, Harvey, Hazel Crest, Homewood, Markham, Midlothian, Oak Forest, Phoenix, Posen, Riverdale, and Robbins. The district has been represented by Democrat Will Davis since January 8, 2003. Davis was re-elected unopposed in 2018. Davis faced no other ballot-listed candidates in the general election.

District 31
The 31st district, located in the Chicago area, includes parts of Bedford Park, Bridgeview, Burr Ridge, Chicago Ridge, Countryside, Hickory Hills, Hodgkins, Hometown, Indian Head Park, Justice, Oak Lawn, Palos Hills, and Willow Springs and parts of the Chicago neighborhoods of Ashburn, Auburn Gresham, Chatham, Chicago Lawn, Englewood, Greater Grand Crossing, and West Englewood. The district has been represented by Democrat Mary E. Flowers since January 9, 1985. Flowers was re-elected unopposed in 2018. Flowers faced Samantha Simpson, a former consulting manager for Deloitte, for the Democratic nomination. After winning the nomination, Flowers faced no other ballot-listed candidates in the general election.

Endorsements

Results

District 32
The 32nd district, located in the Chicago area, includes parts of Bridgeview, Burbank, Hickory Hills, Justice, and Oak Lawn and includes parts of the Chicago neighborhoods of Ashburn, Chicago Lawn, Englewood, Greater Grand Crossing, West Englewood, and Woodlawn. The district has been represented by Democrat Andre Thapedi since January 14, 2009. Thapedi was re-elected unopposed in 2018. Thapedi faced Ricky Gandhi, an economist, for the Democratic nomination. After winning the nomination, Thapedi faced no other ballot-listed candidates in the general election.

Endorsements

Results

District 33
The 33rd district, located in the Chicago area, includes parts of Burnham, Calumet City, Ford Heights, Lansing, Lynwood, and Sauk Village and includes all or parts of the Chicago neighborhoods of Avalon Park, Burnside, Calumet Heights, Chatham, East Side, Hegewisch, South Chicago, and South Deering. The district has been represented by Democrat Marcus C. Evans Jr. since his appointment in April 2012. Evans was re-elected unopposed in 2018. Evans faced no other ballot-listed candidates in the general election.

Endorsements

Results

District 34
The 34th district, located in the Chicago area, includes all or parts of Beecher, Bourbonnais, Burnham, Calumet City, Crete, Ford Heights, Grant Park, Lansing, Lynwood, Manteno, Momence, Peotone, Sauk Village, South Holland, and Willowbrook and includes all or parts of the Chicago neighborhoods of Chatham, Greater Grand Crossing, Hegewisch, Pullman, Riverdale, Roseland, South Deering, and West Pullman. The district has been represented by Democrat Nicholas Smith since his appointment on February 4, 2018. Smith was elected unopposed in 2018. Smith faced no other ballot-listed candidates in the general election.

District 35
The 35th district, located in the Chicago area, includes all or parts of Alsip, Chicago Ridge, Merrionette Park, Oak Lawn, Orland Hills, Orland Park, Palos Heights, Palos Park, Tinley Park, and Worth and includes parts of the Chicago neighborhoods of Auburn Gresham, Beverly, Morgan Park, Mount Greenwood, and Washington Heights. The district has been represented by Democrat Frances Ann Hurley since January 9, 2013. Hurley was re-elected with 68.82% of the vote in 2018. Herbert Hebein, former Chicago police officer and Republican candidate for the 35th district in 2018, was the Republican nominee.

Endorsements

District 36
The 36th district, located in the Chicago area, includes parts of Chicago Ridge, Evergreen Park, Oak Lawn, Palos Heights, Palos Park, Willow Springs, and Worth and includes parts of the Chicago neighborhoods of Ashburn, Auburn Gresham, Beverly, and Mount Greenwood. The district has been represented by Democrat Kelly M. Burke since January 12, 2011. Burke was re-elected unopposed in 2018. Burke faced no other ballot-listed candidates in the general election.

District 37
The 37th district, located in the Chicago area, includes parts of Frankfort, Frankfort Square, Homer Glen, Joliet, Lockport, Mokena, New Lenox, Orland Park, and Tinley Park. The district had been represented by Republican Margo McDermed since January 14, 2015. McDermed was re-elected with 57.98% of the vote in 2018. McDermed announced on July 10, 2019 that she would not seek re-election to the Illinois House. Tim Ozinga, executive vice president at Ozinga, a concrete and building materials business, was the Republican nominee. Michelle Fadeley, a global marketing manager, was the Democratic nominee.

District 38
The 38th district, located in the Chicago area, includes parts of Country Club Hills, Flossmoor, Frankfort, Frankfort Square, Harvey, Hazel Crest, Homewood, Markham, Matteson, Oak Forest, Olympia Fields, Park Forest, Richton Park, Tinley Park, and University Park. The district has been represented by Democrat Debbie Meyers-Martin since January 9, 2019. Meyers-Martin was elected unopposed in 2018. Max Solomon, an attorney and former Democratic primary candidate for the 38th district in 2018, was the Republican nominee.

District 39
The 39th district includes parts of the Chicago neighborhoods of Avondale, Belmont Cragin, Dunning, Hermosa, Irving Park, Logan Square, and Portage Park. The district has been represented by Democrat Will Guzzardi since January 14, 2015. Guzzardi was re-elected unopposed in 2018. Guzzardi faced no other ballot-listed candidates in the general election.

Endorsements

Results

District 40
The 40th district includes parts of the Chicago neighborhoods of Albany Park, Avondale, Irving Park, Logan Square, and Portage Park. The district has been represented by Democrat Jaime Andrade Jr. since his appointment in August 2013. Andrade was re-elected with 99.98% of the vote in 2018. Andrade faced Syamala Krishnamsetty, an organizer, in the Democratic primary. After winning the nomination, Andrade Jr. faced no other ballot-listed candidates in the general election.

Endorsements

Results

District 41
The 41st district, located in the Chicago area, includes parts of Bolingbrook, Naperville, and Warrenville. The district has been represented by Republican Grant Wehrli since January 14, 2015. Wehrli was re-elected with 52% of the vote in 2018. Two candidates ran for the Democratic nomination: Denika McMillen, a social worker and Janet Yang Rohr, director of global data at Morningstar, Inc. After each candidate won their respective nomination, Republican Grant Wehrli faced Democrat Janet Yang Rohr in the general election.

Endorsements

Results

District 42
The 42nd district, located in the Chicago area, includes all or parts of Carol Stream, Lisle, Naperville, Warrenville, West Chicago, Wheaton, and Winfield. The district has been represented by Republican Amy Grant since January 9, 2019. Grant was elected with 52.24% of the vote in 2018. Ken Mejia-Beal, an activist and community organizer, was the Democratic nominee.

District 43
The 43rd district, located in the Chicago area, includes parts of Barrington Hills, Carpentersville, East Dundee, Elgin, Hoffman Estates, and South Elgin. The district has been represented by Democrat Anna Moeller since her appointment in March 2014. Moeller was re-elected with 70.61% of the vote in 2018. Moeller faced no other ballot-listed candidates in the general election.

District 44
The 44th district, located in the Chicago area, includes all or parts of Bartlett, Elgin, Hanover Park, Hoffman Estates, Schaumburg, and Streamwood. The district has been represented by Democrat Fred Crespo since January 10, 2007. Crespo was re-elected with 65.59% of the vote in 2018. Crespo faced no other ballot-listed candidates in the general election.

District 45
The 45th district, located in the Chicago area, includes all or parts of Addison, Bartlett, Bloomingdale, Carol Stream, Elk Grove Village, Hanover Park, Itasca, Roselle, Streamwood, Wayne, West Chicago, and Wood Dale. The district has been represented by Democrat Diane Pappas since January 9, 2019. Pappas was elected with 50.84% of the vote in 2018. Three candidates ran for the Republican nomination: Michael Camerer, a private practice chiropractor; Alfredo "Al" Manzo, a business owner; and Wayne Township Supervisor Randy Ramey, a former member of the Illinois House from the 55th district. Michael Camerer would go on to win the Republican nomination but would die "unexpectedly from natural causes" on June 18, 2020 at the age of 61. Seth Lewis, a small business owner and Republican nominee for the 23rd Senate district in 2016 and 2018, was tapped to be the new Republican nominee.

Endorsements

District 46
The 46th district, located in the Chicago area, includes all or parts of Addison, Bloomingdale, Carol Stream, Elmhurst, Glen Ellyn, Glendale Heights, Hanover Park, Lombard, Oakbrook Terrace, Villa Park, and Wheaton. The district has been represented by Democrat Deb Conroy since January 9, 2013. Conroy was re-elected with 58.68% of the vote in 2018. Conroy faced no other ballot-listed candidates in the general election.

District 47
The 47th district, located in the Chicago area, includes all or parts of Burr Ridge, Clarendon Hills, Darien, Downers Grove, Elmhurst, Hinsdale, Lombard, Oak Brook, Oakbrook Terrace, Villa Park, Western Springs, Westmont, and Willowbrook. The district has been represented by Republican Deanne Mazzochi since her appointment in July 2018. Mazzochi was elected with 51.53% of the vote in 2018. Jennifer Zordani, an attorney, was the Democratic nominee.

Endorsements

District 48
The 48th district, located in the Chicago area, includes parts of Downers Grove, Glen Ellyn, Lisle, Lombard, Oakbrook Terrace, Villa Park, and Wheaton. Howard was elected 53.5% of the vote in 2018. The district has been represented by Democrat Terra Costa Howard since January 9, 2019. Peter Breen, former representative of the district from 2015 to 2019, was the Republican nominee.

District 49
The 49th district, located in the Chicago area, includes parts of Aurora, Bartlett, Batavia, Elgin, Geneva, Naperville, North Aurora, South Elgin, St. Charles, Warrenville, Wayne, and West Chicago. The district had been represented by Democrat Karina Villa since January 9, 2019. Villa was elected with 53.81% of the vote in 2018. Villa ran for state senator in the 25th district, leaving her state representative seat open. Maura Hirschauer, a community organizer, was the Democratic nominee. North Aurora Village trustee Laura Curtis was the Republican nominee.

District 50
The 50th district, located in the Chicago area, includes all or parts of Aurora, Batavia, Big Rock, Campton Hills, Elburn, Geneva, Lily Lake, Montgomery, North Aurora, Oswego, Plano, Prestbury, St. Charles, Sugar Grove, and Yorkville. The district has been represented by Republican Keith R. Wheeler since January 14, 2015. Wheeler was re-elected with 54.99% of the vote in 2018. Kate Monteleone, a non-profit consultant and executive director, was nominated to run as the Democratic nominee.

Districts 51–75

District 51
The 51st district, located in the Chicago area, includes all or parts of Arlington Heights, Barrington, Barrington Hills, Buffalo Grove, Deer Park, Forest Lake, Grayslake, Green Oaks, Gurnee, Hawthorn Woods, Kildeer, Lake Barrington, Lake Zurich, Libertyville, Long Grove, Mettawa, Mundelein, North Barrington, Tower Lakes, Vernon Hills, Wauconda, and Waukegan. The district has been represented by Democrat Mary Edly-Allen since January 9, 2019. Edly-Allen was elected with 50.36% of the vote in 2018. Ela Township Trustee Chris Bos was the Republican nominee.

District 52
The 52nd district, located in the Chicago area, includes all or parts of Algonquin, Barrington, Barrington Hills, Carpentersville, Cary, Crystal Lake, East Dundee, Fox River Grove, Hoffman Estates, Inverness, Island Lake, Lake Barrington, Lake in the Hills, North Barrington, Oakwood Hills, Port Barrington, Prairie Grove, South Barrington, Tower Lakes, Trout Valley, and Wauconda. The district had been represented by Republican David McSweeney since January 9, 2013. McSweeney was re-elected unopposed in 2018. On September 5, 2019, McSweeney announced he would not seek re-election and would focus on either a run for Illinois Secretary of State or US Senator. Barrington Hills Village President Martin McLaughlin was the Republican nominee. Marci Suelzer, a senior manager for a major legal services provider, was tapped as the Democratic nominee. Alia Sarfraz, a paralegal, was tapped to run as the Green Party nominee.

District 53
The 53rd district, located in the Chicago area, includes parts of Arlington Heights, Buffalo Grove, Des Plaines, Elk Grove Village, Mount Prospect, Prospect Heights, and Wheeling. The district has been represented by Democrat Mark L. Walker since January 9, 2019. He formerly represented the 66th district from January 14, 2009 to January 12, 2011. Walker was elected with 52.44% of the vote in 2018. He faced no other ballot-listed candidates in the general election.

District 54
The 54th district, located in the Chicago area, includes parts of Arlington Heights, Barrington, Deer Park, Hoffman Estates, Inverness, Palatine, Rolling Meadows, Schaumburg, and South Barrington. The district has been represented by Republican Tom Morrison since January 12, 2011. Morrison was re-elected with 50.05% of the vote, or by only 43 votes, in 2018. Two candidates ran for the Democratic nomination: Ryan Huffman, a data analyst and Maggie Trevor, a principal of a market research company and Democratic candidate for the district in 2018. After each candidate won their respective nomination, Republican Tom Morrison faced Democrat Maggie Trevor in the general election.

Endorsements

Results

District 55
The 55th district, located in the Chicago area, includes parts of Arlington Heights, Des Plaines, Elk Grove Village, Mount Prospect, Park Ridge, Rolling Meadows, and Schaumburg as well as parts of the Chicago neighborhood of O'Hare. The district has been represented by Democrat Marty Moylan since January 9, 2013. Moylan was re-elected with 55.63% of the vote in 2018. Democrat Marty Moylan faced Libertarian Glenn Olofson in the general election.

District 56
The 56th district, located in the Chicago area, includes parts of Elk Grove Village, Hanover Park, Hoffman Estates, Palatine, Rolling Meadows, Roselle, and Schaumburg. The district has been represented by Democrat Michelle Mussman since January 12, 2011. Mussman was re-elected with 58.86% of the vote in 2018. Schaumburg Township highway commissioner Scott Kegarise was recruited to run as the Republican nominee.

District 57
The 57th district, located in the Chicago area, includes parts of Arlington Heights, Buffalo Grove, Des Plaines, Glenview, Mount Prospect, Northbrook, Palatine, Prospect Heights, and Wheeling. The district has been represented by Democrat Jonathan Carroll since his appointment on October 4, 2017. Caroll was re-elected unopposed in 2018. Carroll faced no other ballot-listed candidates in the general election.

District 58
The 58th district, located in the Chicago area, includes all or parts of Bannockburn, Deerfield, Glencoe, Highland Park, Highwood, Knollwood, Lake Bluff, Lake Forest, Lincolnshire, Mettawa, North Chicago, Northbrook, and Riverwoods. The district has been represented by Democrat Bob Morgan since January 9, 2019. Morgan was elected with 63.81% of the vote in 2018. Morgan faced no other ballot-listed candidates in the general election.

District 59
The 59th district, located in the Chicago area, includes parts of Buffalo Grove, Green Oaks, Gurnee, Indian Creek, Knollwood, Lake Forest, Lincolnshire, Long Grove, Mettawa, Mundelein, North Chicago, Northbrook, Park City, Riverwoods, Vernon Hills, Waukegan, and Wheeling. The district has been represented by Democrat Daniel Didech since January 9, 2019. Didech was elected with 61.34% of the vote in 2018. Didech faced no other ballot-listed candidates in the general election.

District 60
The 60th district, located in the Chicago area, includes parts of Beach Park, Gurnee, North Chicago, Park City, and Waukegan. The district has been represented by Democrat Rita Mayfield since her appointment in July 2010. Mayfield was re-elected unopposed in 2018. Mayfield faced Diana Burdette, a homeschooling educator, for the Democratic nomination. After winning the Democratic nomination, Mayfield faced no other ballot-listed candidates in the general election.

Endorsements

Results

District 61
The 61st district, located in the Chicago area, includes parts of Antioch, Beach Park, Gages Lake, Grandwood Park, Gurnee, Lake Villa, Lindenhurst, Old Mill Creek, Third Lake, Wadsworth, Waukegan, Winthrop Harbor, and Zion. The district has been represented by Democrat Joyce Mason since January 9, 2019. Antioch trustee Dan Yost was the Republican nominee.

District 62
The 62nd district, located in the Chicago area, includes all or parts of Gages Lake, Grayslake, Gurnee, Hainesville, Lake Villa, Long Lake, Round Lake, Round Lake Beach, Round Lake Heights, Round Lake Park, Third Lake, Venetian Village, Volo, Wauconda, and Waukegan. The district has been represented by Democrat Sam Yingling since January 9, 2013. Jim Walsh, a medical physicist, was the Republican nominee.

District 63
The 63rd district, located in the Chicago area, includes all or parts of Bull Valley, Chemung, Crystal Lake, Greenwood, Harvard, Hebron, Johnsburg, Lakemoor, Marengo, McCullom Lake, McHenry, Pistakee Highlands, Richmond, Ringwood, Spring Grove, Union, Wonder Lake, and Woodstock. The district has been represented by Republican Steve Reick since January 11, 2017. Two candidates ran for the Democratic nomination: Peter Janko, president of Lumenelle Lighting Design and Restoration and Brian Sager, retired college professor and administrator. After each candidate won their respective party's nomination, Republican Steve Reick faced Democrat Brian Sager in the general election.

District 64
The 64th district, located in the Chicago area, includes all or parts of Antioch, Bull Valley, Channel Lake, Crystal Lake, Fox Lake, Fox Lake Hills, Holiday Hills, Island Lake, Johnsburg, Lake Catherine, Lake Villa, Lakemoor, Lakewood, Lindenhurst, Long Lake, McHenry, Prairie Grove, Round Lake Heights, Spring Grove, Venetian Village, Volo, Wauconda, Wonder Lake, and Woodstock. The district has been represented by Republican Tom Weber since January 9, 2019. Leslie Armstrong-McLeod, a small business owner, was the Democratic nominee.

Endorsements

District 65
The 65th district, located in the Chicago area, includes all or parts of Batavia, Burlington, Campton Hills, Elgin, Geneva, Gilberts, Hampshire, Huntley, Pingree Grove, South Elgin, St. Charles, and Wayne. The district has been represented by Republican Dan Ugaste since January 9, 2019. Two candidates ran for the Democratic nomination: Mohammad "Mo" Iqbal, a lawyer and civil engineer and Martha Paschke, a patient intake coordinator. After each candidate won their respective nomination, Republican Dan Ugaste faced Democrat Martha Paschke in the general election.

District 66
The 66th district, located in the Chicago area, includes all or parts of Algonquin, Carpentersville, Crystal Lake, East Dundee, Elgin, Gilberts, Huntley, Lake in the Hills, Lakewood, Sleepy Hollow, and West Dundee. The district has been represented by Republican Allen Skillicorn since January 11, 2017. Skillicorn faced McHenry County Board member Carolyn Schofield for the Republican nomination. Two candidates ran for the Democratic nomination: Jim Malone, sheet metal worker and Suzanne Ness, a small business owner. After each candidate won their respective party's nomination, Republican Allen Skillicorn faced Democrat Suzanne Ness in the general election.

District 67
The 67th district covers a large part of Rockford. The district has been represented by Democrat Maurice West since January 9, 2019. Kathleen "Kathie" Jo Hansen ran as the Republican nominee.

District 68
The 68th district covers parts of Cherry Valley, Loves Park, Machesney Park, Rockford, and Roscoe. The district had been represented by Republican John Cabello since his appointment in August 2012. Dave Vella, an attorney, was the Democratic nominee.

District 69
The 69th district covers all or parts of Belvidere, Caledonia, Capron, Cherry Valley, Loves Park, New Milford, Poplar Grove, Rockford, Rockton, Roscoe, South Beloit, and Timberlane. The district has been represented by Republican Joe Sosnowski since January 12, 2011. Sosnowski faced no other ballot-listed candidates in the general election.

District 70
The 70th district, located partly in the Chicago area, includes Belvidere, Big Rock, Burlington, Campton Hills, Cortland, DeKalb, Elgin, Garden Prairie, Genoa, Hampshire, Hinckley, Kaneville, Kingston, Kirkland, Lily Lake, Malta, Maple Park, Poplar Grove, Sugar Grove, Sycamore, and Virgil. The district has been represented by Republican Jeff Keicher since his appointment on July 2, 2018. Paul Stoddard, a retired Associate Professor of Geology at Northern Illinois University and candidate for the district in 2018, was the Democratic nominee.

Endorsements

District 71
The 71st district, located partly in the Quad Cities area, covers all or parts of Albany, Carbon Cliff, Cleveland, Coal Valley, Colona, Como, Cordova, Deer Grove, East Moline, Erie, Fulton, Hampton, Hillsdale, Lyndon, Moline, Morrison, Port Byron, Prophetstown, Rapids City, Rock Falls, Savanna, Silvis, Sterling, Tampico, and Thomson. The district has been represented by Republican Tony McCombie since January 11, 2017. Joan Padilla, the executive director at Hope of Hope Cancer Wellness Center in Dixon and candidate in the 2018 election, was the Democratic nominee.

District 72
The 72nd district, located in the Quad Cities area, covers all or parts of Andalusia, Coyne Center, Milan, Moline, Oak Grove, Reynolds, Rock Island, and Rock Island Arsenal. The district has been represented by Democrat Michael Halpin since January 10, 2017. Glen Evans Sr., a perennial candidate, ran for the Republican nomination.

District 73
The 73rd district, located in the Peoria metropolitan area, covers all or parts of Bay View Gardens, Bradford, Brimfield, Buda, Chillicothe, Dana, Dunlap, Elmwood, Germantown Hills, Henry, Hopewell, La Fayette, La Rose, Lacon, Leonore, Lostant, Metamora, Neponset, Peoria, Peoria Heights, Princeville, Roanoke, Rome, Rutland, Sparland, Spring Bay, Tiskilwa, Toluca, Toulon, Varna, Washburn, Wenona, Wyanet, and Wyoming. The district has been represented by Republican Ryan Spain since January 11, 2017. Spain faced no other ballot-listed candidates in the general election.

District 74
The 74th district covers all or parts of Aledo, Alexis, Alpha, Altona, Amboy, Andover, Annawan, Atkinson, Bishop Hill, Buda, Cambridge, Dover, East Galesburg, Galesburg, Galva, Geneseo, Gilson, Harmon, Henderson, Hooppole, Joy, Keithsburg, Kewanee, Knoxville, La Moille, London Mills, Manlius, Maquon, Matherville, Mineral, New Bedford, New Boston, North Henderson, Oak Run, Ohio, Oneida, Orion, Rio, Seaton, Sheffield, Sherrard, Sublette, Victoria, Viola, Walnut, Wataga, Williamsfield, Windsor, Woodhull, and Yates City. The district has been represented by Republican Daniel Swanson since January 11, 2017. Christopher Demink was the Democratic nominee.

District 75
The 75th district, located in parts of the Chicago area, includes all or parts of Braceville, Braidwood, Carbon Hill, Channahon, Coal City, Diamond, Dwight, Godley, Joliet, Kinsman, Lake Holiday, Lakewood Shores, Lisbon, Marseilles, Mazon, Millbrook, Millington, Minooka, Morris, Newark, Oswego, Plano, Plattville, Ransom, Sandwich, Seneca, Sheridan, Verona, Wilmington, and Yorkville. The district has been represented by Republican David Welter since his appointment in July 2016. Welter faced no other ballot-listed candidates in the general election.

Districts 76–100

District 76
The 76th district covers all or parts of Arlington, Bureau Junction, Cedar Point, Cherry, Dalzell, Dayton, De Pue, Dover, Grand Ridge, Granville, Hennepin, Hollowayville, Kangley, LaSalle, Ladd, Magnolia, Malden, Mark, Marseilles, McNabb, Naplate, North Utica, Oglesby, Ottawa, Peru, Seatonville, Spring Valley, Standard, Streator, Tonica, and Troy Grove. The district has been represented by Democrat Lance Yednock since January 9, 2019. Travis Breeden, a feeder driver with UPS, was the Republican nominee.

District 77
The 77th district, located in the Chicago area, includes all or parts of Addison, Bellwood, Bensenville, Berkeley, Des Plaines, Elk Grove Village, Elmhurst, Franklink Park, Maywood, Melrose Park, Northlake, Rosemont, Stone Park, Villa Park, and Wood Dale as well parts of the Chicago neighborhood of O'Hare. The district has been represented by Democrat Kathleen Willis since January 9, 2013. Anthony Airdo, a sales director and candidate for the district in 2018, was the Republican nominee.

District 78
The 78th district, located in the Chicago area, includes parts of Elmwood Park, Franklin Park, Melrose Park, Oak Park, and River Grove and includes parts of the Chicago neighborhood of Austin. The district has been represented by Democrat Camille Lilly since her appointment in April 2010. Lilly faced Libertarian Joshua Flynn, an insurance consultant, in the general election.

District 79
The 79th district, located mostly in the Chicago area, includes all or parts of Aroma Park, Beecher, Bonfield, Bourbonnais, Braceville, Bradley, Buckingham, Cabery, Chebanse, Coal City, Diamond, East Brooklyn, Essex, Gardner, Godley, Herscher, Hopkins Park, Irwin, Kankakee, Limestone, Momence, Peotone, Reddick, Sammons Point, South Wilmington, St. Anne, Sun River Terrace, and Union Hill. The district had been represented by Republican Lindsay Parkhurst since January 11, 2017. Parkhurst announced on November 13, 2019 that she would not be seeking another term and would instead be running for a judicial post. Kankakee County Board member Jackie Haas was the Republican nominee. Two candidates ran for the Democratic nomination: Charlene Eads, a union steward with AFSCME Local 29 and Kankakee County Board member Robert Ellington-Snipes. Democrat Charlene Eads faced Republican Jackie Haas in the general election.

Endorsements

District 80
The 80th district, located in the Chicago area, includes all or parts of Chicago Heights, Flossmoor, Frankfort, Glenwood, Hazel Crest, Homewood, Joliet, Manhattan, Matteson, Mokena, Monee, New Lenox, Olympia Fields, Park Forest, Richton Park, South Chicago Heights, Steger, Symerton, University Park, and Wilmington. The district has been represented by Democrat Anthony DeLuca since his appointment in March 2009. DeLuca faced Libertarian Clayton Cleveland, an asset and acquisition manager at a real estate company, in the general election.

District 81
The 81st district, located in the Chicago area, includes parts of Bolingbrook, Darien, Downers Grove, Lisle, Naperville, Westmont, and Woodridge. The district has been represented by Democrat Anne Stava-Murray since January 9, 2019. Former Downers Grove Township clerk Laura Hois was the Republican nominee.

Endorsements

District 82
The 82nd district, located in the Chicago area, covers parts of Burr Ridge, Countryside, Darien, Hinsdale, Homer Glen, Indian Head Park, La Grange, Lemont, Lockport, Palos Park, Western Springs, Willow Springs, Willowbrook, and Woodridge. The district has been represented by Republican Leader Jim Durkin since his January 2006 appointment. Kassem Moukahal, an entrepreneur, was the Democratic nominee.

District 83
The 83rd district, located in the Chicago area, includes parts of Aurora, Montgomery, and North Aurora. The district had been represented by Democrat Linda Chapa LaVia since January 8, 2003. She would vacate her seat in February 2019 after being nominated by Governor J. B. Pritzker to serve as director of the Illinois Department of Veterans' Affairs. Democrat Barbara Hernandez was appointed on March 7, 2019 to fill the vacancy. Hernandez faced Juan Thomas, a lawyer and ordained minister, for the Democratic nomination. Democrat Barbara Hernandez faced Republican Don Walter, an election judge, in the general election.

Endorsements

Results

District 84
The 84th district, located in the Chicago area, covers parts of Aurora, Boulder Hill, Montgomery, Naperville, and Oswego. The district has been represented by Democrat Stephanie Kifowit since January 9, 2013. Kifowit faced no other ballot-listed candidates in the general election.

District 85
The 85th district, located in the Chicago area, covers parts of Bolingbrook, Crest Hill, Fairmont, Lemont, Lockport, Naperville, Romeoville, and Woodridge. The district had been represented by Democrat John Connor since his appointment on June 24, 2017. Connor announced on September 24, 2019 that he would seek retiring state senator Pat McGuire's seat in the 43rd district, leaving his own state representative seat open. Dagmara "Dee" Avelar, a community activist, was the Democratic nominee. Ron Doweidt, the Republican precinct committeeperson for DuPage 020 Precinct, was the Republican nominee. Anna Schiefelbein was the Green Party nominee.

Endorsements

District 86
The 86th district, located in the Chicago area, covers all or parts of Channahon, Crest Hill, Elmwood, Ingalls Park, Joliet, New Lenox, Preston Heights, Rockdale, and Shorewood. The district has been represented by Democrat Larry Walsh Jr. since his appointment in April 2012. Walsh Jr. faced no other ballot-listed candidates in the general election.

District 87
The 87th district, located within the Springfield metropolitan area, includes all or parts of Armington, Athens, Atlanta, Beason, Broadwell, Buffalo, Cantrall, Chestnut, Clear Lake, Cornland, Dawson, Delavan, Elkhart, Emden, Grandview, Green Valley, Greenview, Hartsburg, Hopedale, Illiopolis, Lake Petersburg, Latham, Lincoln, Mechanicsburg, Middletown, Minier, Morton, Mount Pulaski, New Holland, Oakford, Pekin, Petersburg, Riverton, Rochester, San Jose, Sherman, Spaulding, Springfield, Tallula, Tremon, and Williamsville. The district has been represented by Republican Tim Butler since his appointment in March 2015. Angel "Gello" Sides, a Democratic candidate in the 2018 Illinois 13th congressional district primary, was the Green Party nominee.

District 88
The 88th district, located in parts of the Peoria metropolitan area and Bloomington–Normal area, covers all or parts of Bloomington, Danvers, Deer Creek, East Peoria, Goodfield, Heritage Lake, Mackinaw, McLean, Morton, Normal, Pekin, Stanford, Twin Grove, and Washington. The district has been represented by Republican Keith P. Sommer since January 13, 1999. Karla Bailey-Smith, owner of Artistic Answers (a painting business), was the Democratic nominee. Kenneth Allison, an accountant, was the Libertarian nominee.

District 89
The 89th district covers all or parts of Adeline, Apple Canyon Lake, Apple River, Cedarville, Chadwick, Coleta, Dakota, Davis, Durand, East Dubuque, Elizabeth, Forreston, Freeport, Galena, The Galena Territory, German Valley, Hanover, Lake Summerset, Lanark, Leaf River, Lena, Menominee, Milledgeville, Mount Carroll, Mount Morris, Nora, Orangeville, Pearl City, Pecatonica, Ridott, Rock City, Rockford, Scales Mound, Shannon, Stockton, Warren, Winnebago, and Winslow. The district has been represented by Republican Andrew Chesney since December 5, 2018. John Cook was an independent candidate who ran in the general election.

District 90
The 90th district covers all or parts of Amboy, Ashton, Byron, Compton, Creston, Davis Junction, DeKalb, Dixon, Earlville, Franklin Grove, Grand Detour, Hillcrest, Lake Holiday, Lee, Leland, Lost Nation, Malta, Mendota, Monroe Center, Nelson, Oregon, Paw Paw, Polo, Rochelle, Sandwich, Shabbona, Somonauk, Steward, Stillman Valley, Sublette, Waterman, and West Brooklyn. The district has been represented by Republican Tom Demmer since January 9, 2013. Seth Wiggins, a technical sergeant, was the Democratic nominee.

District 91
The 91st district, located in the Peoria metropolitan area, includes all or parts of Banner, Bartonville, Bryant, Canton, Creve Coeur, Cuba, Dunfermline, East Peoria, Fairview, Farmington, Glasford, Hanna City, Kingston Mines, Lake Camelot, Lewistown, Liverpool, Mapleton, Marquette Heights, Morton, Norris, North Pekin, Norwood, Pekin, South Pekin, and St. David. The district had been represented by Republican Mike Unes since January 12, 2011. Unes announced on October 24, 2019 that he would not seek re-election. What was previously a contested 3-way primary for the Republican nomination ended up only having one candidate with Pekin Mayor Mark Luft. Both Sam Goddard and Corey Campbell were removed from the Republican primary ballot by the Illinois State Board of Elections "for having insufficient signatures on their nominating petitions." Josh Grys, a former teacher, was the Democratic nominee.

District 92
The 92nd district, located at the heart of the Peoria metropolitan area, covers all or parts of Bartonville, Bellevue, Peoria, Peoria Heights, and West Peoria. The district has been represented by Democrat Jehan Gordon-Booth since January 14, 2009. Chad Grimm was the Libertarian candidate in the general election.

District 93
The 93rd district represents all or parts of Abingdon, Adair, Alexis, Arenzville, Ashland, Astoria, Avon, Bardolph, Bath, Beardstown, Blandinsville, Browning, Bushnell, Camden, Chandlerville, Colchester, Easton, Ellisville, Forest City, Galesburg, Georgetown, Good Hope, Goofy Ridge, Havana, Industry, Ipava, Kilbourne, Littleton, London Mills, Macomb, Manito, Marietta, Mason City, Mound Station, Mount Sterling, Plymouth, Prairie City, Ripley, Rushville, San Jose, Sciota, Smithfield, St. Augustine, Table Grove, Tennessee, Topeka, Vermont, Versailles, and Virginia. The district has been represented by Republican Norine Hammond since her appointment in December 2010. Two candidates ran for the Democratic nomination: Scott Stoll, chief operating officer at Moreland and Devitt Pharmacy and Emiliano Vera, a worker at an elementary school. Republican Norine Hammond faced Democrat Scott Stoll in the general election.

District 94
The 94th district represents all or parts of Augusta, Basco, Bentley, Biggsville, Bowen, Camp Point, Carthage, Clayton, Coatsburg, Columbus, Dallas City, Elvaston, Ferris, Gladstone, Golden, Gulf Port, Hamilton, Kirkwood, La Harpe, La Prairie, Liberty, Lima, Little York, Lomax, Loraine, Media, Mendon, Monmouth, Nauvoo, Oquawka, Payson, Plainville, Plymouth, Pontoosuc, Quincy, Raritan, Roseville, Stronghurst, Ursa, Warsaw, and West Point. The district has been represented by Republican Randy Frese since January 14, 2015. Angel Smith, a Navy veteran, was the Democratic nominee.

Endorsements

District 95
The 95th district includes all or parts of Assumption, Benld, Brighton, Bunker Hill, Butler, Carlinville, Coalton, Coffeen, Donnellson, Dorchester, Eagarville, East Gillespie, Farmersville, Fillmore, Gillespie, Girard, Harvel, Hillsboro, Holiday Shores, Irving, Lake Ka-Ho, Litchfield, Livingston, Medora, Morrisonville, Mount Clare, Mount Olive, Moweaqua, New Douglas, Nilwood, Nokomis, Ohlman, Owaneco, Palmer, Pana, Panama, Raymond, Royal Lakes, Sawyerville, Schram City, Shipman, Standard City, Staunton, Stonington, Taylor Springs, Taylorville, Virden, Waggoner, Walshville, Wenonah, White City, Williamson, Witt, and Worden. The district has been represented by Republican Avery Bourne since her appointment in February 2015. Bourne faced Lawrence Oliver, the director of field services for PDC Laboratories in Florissant, Missouri, for the Republican nomination. Bourne won the nomination. Chase Wilhelm, a member of the United States Army Reserve, was the Democratic nominee.

Endorsements

District 96
The 96th district, located in the Springfield metropolitan area, includes all or parts of Blue Mound, Boody, Bulpitt, Decatur, Edinburg, Harristown, Jeisyville, Kincaid, Mount Auburn, Niantic, Rochester, Springfield, Stonington, Taylorville, and Tovey. The district has been represented by Democrat Sue Scherer since January 9, 2013. Charlie McGorray, a former fire captain, was selected as the Republican nominee. John Keating, a community organizer and activist, ran as the Green Party nominee.

District 97
The 97th district, located in the Chicago area, includes parts of Aurora, Bolingbrook, Boulder Hill, Channahon, Joliet, Montgomery, Naperville, Oswego, Plainfield, Romeoville, and Shorewood. The district has been represented by Republican Mark Batinick since January 14, 2015. Harry Benton, a union iron worker, was the Democratic nominee.

District 98
The 98th district, located in the Chicago area, includes all or parts of Bolingbrook, Crest Hill, Crystal Lawns, Joliet, Romeoville, and Shorewood. The district has been represented by Democrat Natalie Manley since January 9, 2013. Manley faced no other ballot-listed candidates in the general election.

District 99
The 99th district, located in the Springfield metropolitan area, covers all or parts of Auburn, Berlin, Chatham, Curran, Divernon, Jerome, Leland Grove, Loami, New Berlin, Pawnee, Pleasant Plains, Southern View, Springfield, Thayer, and Virden. The district has been represented by Republican Mike Murphy since January 9, 2019. Murphy faced no other ballot-listed candidates in the general election.

District 100
The 100th district, located in parts of the Metro East, covers all or parts of Alsey, Batchtown, Baylis, Bluffs, Brighton, Brussels, Carrollton, Chapin, Chesterfield, Concord, Detroit, El Dara, Eldred, Exeter, Fidelity, Fieldon, Florence, Franklin, Glasgow, Godfrey, Grafton, Greenfield, Griggsville, Hamburg, Hardin, Hettick, Hillview, Hull, Jacksonville, Jerseyville, Kampsville, Kane, Kinderhook, Lynnville, Manchester, Meredosia, Milton, Modesto, Murrayville, Naples, Nebo, New Canton, New Salem, Otterville, Palmyra, Peal, Perry, Pittsfield, Pleasant Hill, Rockbridge, Roodhouse, Scottville, South Jacksonville, Time, Valley City, Waverly, White Hall, Wilmington, Winchester, and Woodson. The district has been represented by Republican C. D. Davidsmeyer since his appointment in December 2012. Jacksonville alderman Brandon Adams was selected as the Democratic nominee in the general election. Ralph Sides ran as a candidate in the general election under his newly formed Pro-Gun Pro-Life Party.

Endorsements

Districts 101–118

District 101
The 101st district, located partly in the Bloomington-Normal area, covers all or parts of Argenta, Arrowsmith, Atwood, Bellflower, Bement, Cerro Gorod, Champaign, Cisco, Clinton, De Land, De Witt, Decatur, Downs, Ellsworth, Farmer City, Fisher, Foosland, Forsyth, Hammond, Heyworth, Ivesdale, Kenney, Lake of the Woods, LaPlace, Le Roy, Long Creek, Ludlow, Mahomet, Mansfield, Maroa, Monticello, Mount Zion, Niantic, Oreana, Saybrook, Wapella, Warrensburg, Waynesville, Weldon, and White Heath. The district has been represented by Republican Dan Caulkins since January 9, 2019. Caulkins faced no other ballot-listed candidates in the general election.

District 102
The 102nd district covers parts of the Champaign-Urbana metropolitan area, including all or parts of Allenville, Allerton, Arcola, Arthur, Atwood, Bethany, Bondville, Broadlands, Brocton, Camargo, Champaign, Chrisman, Cowden, Fairmount, Findlay, Garrett, Gays, Herrick, Hindsboro, Homer, Hume, Ivesdale, Longview, Lovington, Macon, Metcalf, Mount Zion, Moweaqua, Newman, Oconee, Pana, Paris, Pesotum, Philo, Redmon, Sadorus, Savoy, Seymour, Shelbyville, Sidell, Sidney, Sigel, St. Joseph, Stewardson, Strasburg, Sullivan, Tolono, Tower Hill, Tuscola, Vermilion, Villa Grove, Westervelt, and Windsor. The district has been represented by Republican Brad Halbrook since January 11, 2017, previously serving the 110th district in the Illinois House of Representatives from April 2012 to January 14, 2015. Mitchell Esslinger, a farm worker on his family's centennial farm, was selected as the Democratic nominee in the general election.

Endorsements

District 103
The 103rd district covers the heart of the Champaign–Urbana metropolitan area, including most of Champaign and Urbana. The district has been represented by Democrat Carol Ammons since January 14, 2015. Ammons faced off against Libertarian Brad Bielert in the November 3, 2020 general election.

District 104
The 104th district covers parts of the Champaign-Urbana metropolitan area, including all or parts of Belgium, Catlin, Champaign, Danville, Fithian, Georgetown, Gifford, Indianola, Muncie, Oakwood, Olivet, Penfield, Rantoul, Ridge Farm, Royal, Savoy, Thomasboro, Tilton, and Westville. The district has been represented by Republican Michael Marron since his appointment on September 7, 2018. Cynthia Cunningham, founder of Cobalt Creek Consulting and Democratic candidate for the district in 2018, was the Democratic nominee.

District 105
The 105th district, located in the Bloomington-Normal area, includes all or parts of Anchor, Bloomington, Carlock, Chenoa, Colfax, Cooksville, Downs, El Paso, Fairbury, Forrest, Gridley, Hudson, Lexington, Normal, Strawn, and Towanda. The district has been represented by Republican Dan Brady since January 9, 2013, who formerly represented the 88th district from January 10, 2001 to January 9, 2013. Brady faced David Paul Blumenshine, a real estate broker and candidate in the Republican primary in 2018, for the Republican nomination. Brady won the Republican nomination. Normal Town Council member Chemberly Cummings was the Democratic nominee.

Endorsements

District 106
The 106th district covers parts of the Champaign-Urbana metropolitan area, including all or parts of Alvan, Ashkum, Beaverville, Benson, Bismarck, Buckley, Cabery, Campus, Chatsworth, Chebanse, Cissna Park, Clifton, Congerville, Cornell, Crescent City, Cullom, Danforth, Deer Creek, Donovan, Dwight, El Paso, Elliott, Emington, Eureka, Flanagan, Forrest, Gibson City, Gilman, Goodfield, Henning, Hoopeston, Iroquois, Kappa, Kempton, Loda, Long Point, Martinton, Melvin, Milford, Minonk, Odell, Onarga, Panola, Papineau, Paxton, Piper City, Pontiac, Potomac, Rankin, Reddick, Roanoke, Roberts, Rossville, Saunemin, Secor, Sheldon, Sibley, Thawville, Watseka, Wellington, and Woodland. The district has been represented by Republican Tom Bennett since January 14, 2015. Bennett faced no other ballot-listed candidates in the general election.

District 107
The 107th district includes all or parts of Alma, Altamont, Beecher City, Bingham, Brownstown, Central City, Centralia, Edgewood, Effingham, Farina, Greenville, Iuka, Junction City, Kell, Keyesport, Kinmundy, Mason, Mulberry Grove, Odin, Old Ripley, Panama, Patoka, Pierron, Pocahontas, Ramsey, Salem, Sandoval, Shumway, Smithboro, Sorento, St. Elmo, St. Peter, Teutopolis, Vandalia, Vernon, Walnut Hill, Wamac, and Watson. The district has been represented by Republican Blaine Wilhour since January 9, 2019. Dave Seiler, a history instructor at Lake Land College and Democratic candidate for the district in 2018, was the Democratic nominee.

District 108
The 108th district, located in the Metro East, includes all or parts of Addieville, Albers, Alhambra, Aviston, Bartelso, Beckemeyer, Breese, Carlyle, Centralia, Damiansville, Edwardsville, Germantown, Grantfork, Hamel, Highland, Hoffman, Hoyleton, Huey, Irvington, Marine, Maryville, Mascoutah, Nashville, New Baden, New Minden, O'Fallon, Oakdale, Okawville, Pierron, Richview, St. Jacob, Summerfield, Trenton, Troy, and Venedy. The district has been represented by Republican Charles Meier since January 9, 2013. Kacie Weicherding, a former volunteer for AmeriCorps, was the Democratic nominee.

Endorsements

District 109
The 109th district, located in the Illinois Wabash Valley, includes all or parts of Albion, Allendale, Bellmont, Bone Gap, Bridgeport, Browns, Burnt Prairie, Calhoun, Carmi, Cisne, Claremont, Clay City, Crossville, Dieterich, Enfield, Fairfield, Flora, Golden Gate, Grayville, Iola, Jeffersonville, Johnsonville, Keenes, Keensburg, Louisville, Maunie, Montrose, Mount Carmel, Mount Erie, Newtown, Noble, Norris City, Olney, Parkersburg, Phillipstown, Rose Hill, Sailor Springs, Sims, Springerton, St. Francisville, Ste. Marie, Sumner, Teutopolis, Watson, Wayne City, West Salem, Wheeler, Willow Hill, Xenia, and Yale. The district had been represented by Republican Darren Bailey since January 9, 2019. Bailey announced in July 2019 his intentions to run for state senator in the 55th district, leaving his own seat open. Two candidates ran for the Republican nomination: Richland County Sheriff Andy Hires and Adam Niemerg, an employee of Country Financial. Adam Niemerg won the Republican nomination. John Spencer, another Country Financial agent, was the Democratic nominee.

District 110
The 110th district includes all or parts of Annapolis, Ashmore, Casey, Charleston, Flat Rock, Greenup, Humboldt, Hutsonville, Jewett, Kansas, Lawrenceville, Lerna, Marshall, Martinsville, Mattoon, Neoga, Oakland, Oblong, Palestine, Robinson, Russellville, Stoy, Toledo, West Union, West York, and Westfield. The district has been represented by Republican Chris Miller since January 9, 2019. Kody Czerwonka, an accountant, is an Independent candidate in the general election.

Endorsements

District 111
The 111th district, located in the Metro East, includes all or parts of Alton, Bethalto, East Alton, Edwardsville, Elsah, Godfrey, Granite City, Hartford, Holiday Shores, Madison, Mitchell, Pontoon Beach, Rosewood Heights, Roxana, South Roxana, and Wood River. The district had been represented by Democrat Monica Bristow since her appointment on December 19, 2017. Amy Elik, a CPA and auditor, was the Republican nominee.

District 112
The 112th district, located in the Metro East, includes all or parts of Bethalto, Caseyville, Collinsville, Edwardsville, Fairmont City, Fairview Heights, Glen Carbon, Granite City, Madison, Maryville, O'Fallon, Pontoon Beach, Roxana, Shiloh, Swansea, and Wood River. The district has been represented by Democrat Katie Stuart since January 11, 2017. Lisa Ciampoli, a "local nurse anesthetist and former Madison County Board member," was selected to be the Republican nominee in the general election.

District 113
The 113th district, located in the Metro East, includes all or parts of Belleville, Brooklyn, Caseyville, Collinsville, East St. Louis, Fairmont City, Fairview Heights, Granite City, Madison, Shiloh, Swansea, Venice, and Washington Park. Democrat Jay Hoffman, who has been a member of the Illinois House of Representatives since January 9, 1991 (with a nine-month interruption in 1997), has represented the district since January 9, 2013. Hoffman was in a three-way race against Libertarian Mark Elmore and Constitution Party candidate Ryan Musick.

District 114
The 114th district, located in the Metro East, includes all or parts of Alorton, Belleville, Cahokia, Centreville, East St. Louis, Fairmont City, Fairview Heights, Freeburg, Lebanon, Mascoutah, Millstadt, O'Fallon, Rentchler, Sauget, Scott Air Force Base, Shiloh, Smithton and Washington Park. The district has been represented by Democrat LaToya Greenwood since January 11, 2017. St. Clair Township Supervisor Dave Barnes was the Republican nominee.

Endorsements

District 115
The 115th district includes all or parts of Alto Pass, Anna, Ashley, Ava, Belle Rive, Bluford, Bonnie, Campbell Hill, Carbondale, Centralia, Cobden, De Soto, Dix, Dongola, Du Bois, Du Quoin, Elkville, Gorham, Grand Tower, Harrison, Ina, Jonesboro, Makanda, Mill Creek, Mount Vernon, Murphysboro, Nashville, Opdyke, Pinckneyville, Radom, Richview, St. Johns, Tamaroa, Vergennes, Waltonville, and Woodlawn. The district had been represented by Republican Terri Bryant since January 14, 2015. Bryant announced on August 27, 2019 her candidacy for state senator in the 58th district, leaving her own state representative seat open. Five candidates ran for the Republican nomination: John Howard, a grain and livestock farmer; Dr. Paul Jacobs, an optometrist and owner of Von Jakob Winery and Brewery; Clifford Lindemann, retired; Zachary Meyer, a former law clerk for Perry County state's attorney office; and Johnnie Ray Smith II, a correctional lieutenant for IDOC. Jacobs won the Republican nomination. Randy Auxier, a professor at SIUC and Green Party candidate in the 2018 Illinois 12th Congressional District general election, was the Green Party candidate in the general election. Ian Peak was the Libertarian candidate in the general election.

District 116
The 116th district, located in part of the Metro East, includes all or parts of Baldwin, Cahokia, Chester, Columbia, Coulterville, Cutler, Darmstadt, Du Quoin, Dupo, East Carondelet, Ellis Grove, Evansville, Fayetteville, Floraville, Fults, Hecker, Kaskaskia, Lenzburg, Maeystown, Marissa, Millstadt, New Athens, Paderborn, Percy, Pinckneyville, Prairie du Rocher, Red Bud, Rockwood, Ruma, Sauget, Smithton, Sparta, St. Libory, Steeleville, Tilden, Valmeyer, Waterloo, and Willisville. The district had been represented by Democrat Jerry Costello II since January 12, 2011. Costello would vacate his seat after being named director of law enforcement for the Illinois Department of Natural Resources. Democrat Nathan Reitz was appointed to fill the seat on May 9, 2019. Three candidates ran for the Republican nomination: David Friess, a United States Air Force veteran and Republican candidate in 2018; David Holder, a certified public accountant and governmental auditor; and Kevin Schmidt, a chiropractor. Friess won the Republican nomination.

District 117
The 117th district includes all or parts of Benton, Buckner, Bush, Cambria, Carbondale, Carterville, Christopher, Colp, Crab Orchard, Creal Springs, Energy, Ewing, Freeman Spur, Granville, Hanaford, Herrin, Hurst, Johnston City, Macedonia, Marion, McLeansboro, Mulkeytown, North City, Orient, Pittsburg, Royalton, Sesser, Spillertown, Stonefort, Thompsonville, Valier, West City, West Frankfort, Whiteash, and Zeigler. The district has been represented by Republican Dave Severin since January 11, 2017. Severin faced Tim Arview, a small business owner, for the Republican nomination. After winning the Republican nomination, Severin faced no other ballot-listed candidates in the general election.

District 118
The 118th district includes all or parts of Anna, Belknap, Belle Prairie City, Brookport, Broughton, Buncombe, Burnside, Cairo, Carbondale, Carrier Mills, Cave-In-Rock, Cypress, Dahlgren, Dongola, East Cape Girardeau, Eddyville, Eldorado, Elizabethtown, Equality, Galatia, Golconda, Goreville, Harrisburg, Joppa, Junction, Karnak, Makanda, Marion, McClure, McLeansboro, Metropolis, Mound City, Mounds, New Grand Chain, New Haven, Old Shawneetown, Olive Branch, Olmsted, Omaha, Pulaski, Raleigh, Ridgway, Rosiclare, Shawneetown, Simpson, Stonefort, Tamms, Thebes, Ullin, and Vienna. The district has been represented by Republican Patrick Windhorst since January 9, 2019. Windhorst faced no other ballot-listed candidates in the general election.

References

External links
Find your district/elected officials 
Illinois Online Voter Registration Application 
Polling Place Lookup

External links
 
 
  (State affiliate of the U.S. League of Women Voters)
 

Illinois House of Representatives
2020
Illinois House